Tiger Tunes was a Danish popular indie pop band. Formed in 2001, the band initially used the internet to distribute their music, releasing two singles from their album Forget About the Stupid Rocket Idea! In 2003, the band played at several festivals in Denmark: Roskilde, Midtfyns and at the Skanderborgfestival. Although only releasing a few singles, the band won the Steppeulv Award in the "Newcomer of the Year" category in 2004. Despite this early success, the band's later works failed to gain recognition, and they later disbanded.

Members
Mr Q – Programming and drums
K. R. Hansen – Vocals
Knø – Guitar
Marie – Synth and vocals
Lasse Lakken – Bass and synth

Discography
 Forget About the Stupid Rocket Idea! (2004)
 Absolutely Worthless Compared To Important Books (2005)
 Foolio (2005)
 Pancake America (2005)

References

External links
 Myspace
 Orkut Official Community

Danish rock music groups
Musical groups established in 2001
Indie pop groups
Lo-fi music groups